Tree pose or Vrikshasana is a balancing asana. It is one of the very few standing poses in medieval hatha yoga, and remains popular in modern yoga as exercise. The pose has been called iconic of modern yoga; it is often featured in yoga magazines, and practised in public displays such as for the International Day of Yoga.

Etymology and origins 

The name comes from the Sanskrit words  meaning 'tree', and  meaning 'posture'.

A 7th-century stone carving in Mahabalipuram appears to contain a figure standing on one leg, perhaps indicating that a pose similar to vrikshasana was in use at that time. It is said that sadhus disciplined themselves by choosing to meditate in the pose.

The pose is described in the 17th century Gheraṇḍa Saṃhitā 2.36. More recently it has been called iconic of modern yoga; it is often featured in yoga magazines, and practised in public displays such as for the International Day of Yoga.

Description 

The pose is entered from Tadasana. The most common form has one knee bent and the foot of that leg placed on the inner thigh of the standing leg; alternatively, the bent leg may be placed in half lotus position. The hands are held above the head, either pointed directly upwards and unclasped, or clasped together in anjali mudra.

Vrikshasana is derived from the Sanskrit  term  which combines Vriksha and position Vriksha means Tree, and Asana means posture. Vrikshasan or the Tree pose is a lovely meditation which integrates our body, mind and breath . This implores the qualities of mercy, generosity, flexibility, tolerance, strength, endurance, balance and grace which helps an individual to achieve overall growth in his or her life. As rightly mentioned in the Brahma Samhita, which is an ancient book where Lord Brahma instantly composed  poetic praises for the supreme divinity.

Variations

In Bikram Yoga, Tree pose (which it calls "Tadasana") has one leg folded in half lotus and the hands together over the chest in prayer position. It is followed by bending the straight leg into a squatting position (called Toe Stand or "Padangushtasana" in Bikram Yoga) with the heel raised and the thigh resting on the calf and heel, the other leg remaining in half lotus.

The pose may be modified according to the practitioner's ability to balance. The hands may be held apart, either straight up or out at an angle, or lowered into prayer position in front of the chest. Or, one heel can be raised and placed against the shin of the standing leg, if necessary keeping the toes on the ground. Another option is to stand beside a wall and place one hand on it. Alternatively, the pose can be practised reclining on the floor, if need be with a block under the bent knee.

Applications 

Tree pose has been recommended for older people to help them maintain good balance and so to reduce the risk of injury from falls. There is preliminary evidence that a yoga programme including tree pose may help to prevent falls among older people.

See also 

 List of asanas

References

Sources 

 
 

Standing asanas
Medieval Hatha Yoga asanas
Asymmetric asanas